Bethel Springs Presbyterian Church is a historic Presbyterian church on 3rd Avenue in Bethel Springs, Tennessee.

The church was established in 1829 and is the oldest church still in operation in McNairy County. The Colonial Revival-style church building was constructed in 1893 and added to the National Register of Historic Places in 1983. A cemetery located next to the church includes burials of Confederate soldiers.

References

Presbyterian churches in Tennessee
Churches on the National Register of Historic Places in Tennessee
Colonial Revival architecture in Tennessee
Churches completed in 1893
19th-century Presbyterian church buildings in the United States
Buildings and structures in McNairy County, Tennessee
National Register of Historic Places in McNairy County, Tennessee